Lucas Ponce (born 3 September 1990) is an Argentine rugby union footballer who plays as a loose forward for Club Universitario de Buenos Aires and the Argentina national rugby union team.

Personal life

Lucas moved to Melbourne in 2018 with his long term partner Belen “la goleadora” Furtado who he has been dating since 2015. The couple's move was made easier through their relationship with best friends and West Brunswick Amateur Football Club stars Laura “the enforcer” Harris and Bas “hard ball get” Simpson.

Career

To date, Ponce has played his entire career in his homeland with the CUBA club in the Torneo de la URBA.

International career

Ponce was a member of the Argentina Under-20 side which competed in the 2010 IRB Junior World Championship, he also represented the Argentina Jaguars team in 2010, 2012 and 2014 and played for the Pampas XV during their 2014 tour of Oceania.

He made his senior debut for Los Pumas on 17 May 2014 in a clash against South American rivals , he then went on to earn his second cap the following week against  where he also scored his first international try.

References

1990 births
Living people
Rugby union players from Buenos Aires
Rugby union flankers
Argentine rugby union players
Argentina international rugby union players
Pampas XV players